The Best of Frank Herbert (1975) is a collection of thirteen short stories by American science fiction author Frank Herbert and edited by Angus Wells.  In 1976 this book was re-released as a two volume set; The Best of Frank Herbert 1952–1964 and The Best of Frank Herbert 1965–1970.  All of the stories in this collection had been previously published in magazine or book form.

Contents

The Best of Frank Herbert 1952–1964
"Looking for Something?" - short story - Startling Stories, April 1952
"Nightmare Blues" - novelette - Best SF Stories and Novels, 1955
"Dragon in the Sea" (Excerpt) - short fiction - 1956
"Cease Fire" - short story - Astounding Science Fiction, January 1958
"Egg and Ashes" - short story - If, November 1960
"The Mary Celeste Move" - short story - Analog, October 1964

The Best of Frank Herbert 1965–1970
"Committee of the Whole" - novelette - Galaxy Magazine, April 1965
"Dune" (Excerpt) - short fiction - 1965
"By the Book" - novelette - Analog, August 1966
"The Primitives" - novelette - Galaxy Magazine, April 1966
"The Heaven Makers" (Excerpt) - short fiction - 1967
"The Being Machine" (also known as  "The Mind Bomb") - novelette - If, October 1969
"Seed Stock" - short story - Analog, April 1970

External links
DuneNovels.com ~ Official site of Dune and Herbert Limited Partnership

1975 short story collections
Short story collections by Frank Herbert
Sidgwick & Jackson books